The seventh series of The Great British Sewing Bee began on 14 April 2021. Joe Lycett returned as the presenter of the show, with both Esme Young and Patrick Grant returning as the judges. The series consisted of 12 contestants competing to be named the best sewer. The show aired on BBC One and was filmed during the COVID-19 pandemic. The series was filmed at The Chainstore on Trinity Buoy Wharf in London's Docklands, a grade II listed building, built in 1854, and connected to London's only lighthouse.

The Sewers

Results and Eliminations 

 Sewer was the series winner

 Sewer was the series runner-up

 Best Garment: Sewer won Garment of the Week

 One of the judges' favourite sewers

 Sewer was safe and got through to next round

 One of the judges' least favourite sewers

 Sewer was eliminated

Episodes 

  Sewer eliminated   Garment of the Week

Episode 1: Wardrobe Staples Week

Episode 2: Summer Week

Episode 3: Menswear Week

Episode 4: International Week

Episode 5: Children's Week

Episode 6: Reduce, Reuse and Recycle Week

Episode 7: Winter Week

Episode 8: Music of the Movies Week

Episode 9: 1940s Week - Semi-Final

Episode 10: Celebration Week - The Final

Ratings 

Official ratings are taken from BARB.

References 

2021 British television seasons
The Great British Sewing Bee